Sir William Molesworth, 6th Baronet (30 June 1758 – 22 February 1798) was one of the Molesworth baronets of Pencarrow, Cornwall and a British politician who sat in the House of Commons from 1784 and 1790.

Early life
Molesworth was the son of Sir John Molesworth, 5th Baronet who was previously MP for Cornwall. He was educated at Eton College from 1769 to 1774 and matriculated at St John's College, Cambridge in 1776. He succeeded his father in the Baronetcy as 6th Baronet on 20 October 1775. He married Catherine Treby, daughter of Paul Henry Ourry on 27 May 1786.

Political career
Molesworth was returned unopposed as Member of Parliament for Cornwall in a by-election on 25 February 1784. He was returned again unopposed at the 1784 general election. He spoke progressively more frequently and pursued an independent line. In September 1789, Molesworth saw he would be opposed at the 1790 general election and decided not to stand. He said: "You called me unsolicited on my part to be your representative, and if you no longer wish for my services I am ready to return to the private situation from whence you took me."

Later life
Molesworth died on 22 February 1798 and his son Arscott Ourry Molesworth (1789 – 26 December 1823) succeeded to the baronetcy. His youngest daughter Caroline Molesworth (1794–1872) was a botanist whose observations were published in 1880 as The Cobham Journals: abstracts and summaries of meteorological and phenological observations made by Miss Caroline Molesworth, at Cobham, Surrey, in the years 1825-1850.

References

1758 births
1798 deaths
People educated at Eton College
Alumni of St John's College, Cambridge
Politicians from Cornwall
Members of the Parliament of Great Britain for constituencies in Cornwall
Baronets in the Baronetage of England
British MPs 1784–1790